Luant is a commune in the Indre department in central France. The writer Raymonde Vincent (1908–1985), winner of the Prix Femina in 1937 was born in Luant.

Geography
The commune is located in the parc naturel régional de la Brenne.

Population

See also
Communes of the Indre department

References

Communes of Indre